Bruto Diodato "Uto" Ughi  (born 21 January 1944) is an Italian violinist and conductor. He was the music director of the Orchestra dell'Accademia Nazionale di Santa Cecilia between 1987 and 1992. He is considered one of Italy's greatest living violinists and is also active in the promotion of classical music in today's culture.

Career 
When he was young he started to play the violin, at only «5 or 6 years» he said, and he made his debut at 7 years old, at the Teatro Lirico di Milano. At 12 years he was considered a mature artist.

He involves himself in many activities to promote music culture. He is the founder of several music festivals, namely "Omaggio a Venezia", "Omaggio a Roma" (1999–2002) and "Uto Ughi per Roma." In tandem with Bruno Tosi, Uto Ughi instituted the musical prize "Una vita per la Musica" ("A life for Music").

On September 4, 1997, he was commissioned Cavaliere della Gran Croce by the Italian President and in 2002 he received a degree honoris causa in Communication studies. He has won various awards, the most prestigious "Una vita per la musica - Leonard Bernstein" (23/6/1997), "Galileo 2000" prize (5/7/2003) and the international prize "Ostia Mare" (8/8/2003).

Ughi has possessed the following fine instruments: the Van Houten-Kreutzer (1701) and Sinsheimer-General Kyd-Perlman (1714) by Antonio Stradivari; and the Kortschak-Wurlitzer (1739), Ole Bull (1744) and Cariplo-Hennel-Rosé (1744) by Giuseppe Guarneri del Gesù.

He received the America Award of the Italy-USA Foundation in 2015.

Discography

Studio albums

Other albums

Bibliography
 Quel diavolo di un trillo. Note della mia vita  (That devil trill. Notes from my life)  (2013)

References

External links

Uto Ughi official website

1944 births
Living people
People from Busto Arsizio
Italian classical violinists
Male classical violinists
Italian male conductors (music)
21st-century Italian conductors (music)
21st-century Italian male musicians
21st-century classical violinists